The Central Luzon Link Expressway (CLLEX), also known as the Central Luzon Link Freeway, is a partially operational expressway in the Central Luzon region of the Philippines. It will connect the Subic–Clark–Tarlac Expressway (SCTEX) and the Tarlac–Pangasinan–La Union Expressway (TPLEX) to the currently under-construction North Luzon East Expressway in Cabanatuan towards San Jose, Nueva Ecija. It is currently toll-free and exclusively open to Class 1 vehicles but it will be tolled and opened to other classes of vehicles in the future.

Route description 

CLLEX runs in an east-west direction from Tarlac City to San Jose, Nueva Ecija. The entire route is built as a four-lane expressway mostly laid out on embankment.

Phase 1 
From the west, CLLEX begins at a trumpet interchange with the Subic–Clark–Tarlac Expressway (SCTEX) and Tarlac–Pangasinan–La Union Expressway (TPLEX) in Tarlac City. The expressway intersects Santa Rosa–Tarlac Road at a diamond interchange where the expressway passes above grade. The expressway then passes agricultural land, before turning east as it enters La Paz. It crosses La Paz–Victoria Road where an interchange serving entering westbound vehicles and exiting eastbound vehicles, connects the two. The expressway continues east as it crosses through a viaduct over the Rio Chico River, and crosses the Tarlac–Nueva Ecija boundary before crossing the Talavera River.

The expressway then continues east as it enters Zaragoza, Nueva Ecija. It turns northeast as it meets Zaragoza interchange, a trumpet interchange connecting with Zaragoza–Aliaga Road. It makes a reverse curve turning southeast before crossing Guimba–Aliaga Road as it enters Aliaga, where a temporary exit is built as the expressway's current terminus.

History
In 2010, the Japan International Cooperation Agency (JICA) formulated the creation of an expressway network under the High Standard Highway Network Development Master Plan, focusing on a growth area within the  radium sphere of Metro Manila. The DPWH, under JICA's assistance, completed the feasibility study for the proposed Central Luzon Expressway (CLEX) on the same year.

The proposed project was to divided into two (2) phases: Phase 1 with a  network beginning from the connection of SCTEX and TPLEX in Balingcanaway, Tarlac City and ends at the Pan-Philippine Highway (Daang Maharlika) in Caalibangbangan, Cabanatuan; and Phase 2 with  network beginning from the Phase 1 terminus in Cabanatuan and ends at San Jose town proper.

The project was renamed to Central Luzon Link Expressway (CLLEX) in 2011 after the preparatory survey and final report plan for Phase 1 was concluded.

The Japan International Cooperation Agency (JICA) would fund the construction of the  CLLEX, while operation and maintenance would be under the Public-Private Partnership (PPP) scheme.

In the President Benigno Aquino III's State of the Nation address in 2014, the CLLEX was one of many of the administration's priority projects involving massive infrastructure spending in Central Luzon.

The groundbreaking ceremony was held on September 22, 2017, along with the beginning of construction. The expressway was originally planned to open in December 2020, but was repeatedly delayed due to the COVID-19 pandemic.

The first  of the expressway from Tarlac City to Aliaga was inaugurated by President Rodrigo Duterte on July 15, 2021. The expressway opened to vehicles on the same day.

In July 2022, DPWH announced that CLLEX will be completed by July 2023. The current Phase 1 terminus in Aliaga will see an extension of seven kilometers up to San Juan Interchange and four kilometers to Umangan–Julo Road, before ending at Felipe Vergara Highway and the Pan–Philippine Highway.

List is Exits

Notes

References

External links 
 Central Luzon Link Expressway: Build.gov.ph
 CLLEx from Department of Public Works and Highways

Roads in Nueva Ecija
Roads in Tarlac
Toll roads in the Philippines